On 17 March 2018, a Piper PA-23 Apache crashed into a residential area in Plaridel, Bulacan, Philippines, killing all five people (three passengers and two pilots) on board and five others on the ground.

Aircraft
The aircraft involved was a six-seater Piper PA-23 light aircraft operated by Lite Air Express, with tail number RP-C299.

Crash
The Civil Aviation Authority of the Philippines (CAAP) said the aircraft bound for Laoag, Ilocos Norte crashed upon takeoff from Plaridel Airport at 11:21, local time (UTC+8). Shortly before the crash, eyewitnesses on the ground observed the aircraft flying low, hitting a tree and an electric post, before slamming into the house.

Authorities said the plane carried five people. The five other casualties, which included three minors, belonged to a family living in the house the plane crashed into. In addition, two other people were injured by burning debris.

Investigation
CAAP's accident investigators and a team from Flight Safety & Inspectorate Service (FSIS) were immediately dispatched to the crash site.
CAAP said that all aircraft operated by Lite Air Express are grounded pending results of investigation.

References

2018 disasters in the Philippines
Aviation accidents and incidents in 2018
Aviation accidents and incidents in the Philippines
History of Bulacan
March 2018 events in the Philippines